Veidt may refer to:

People
 Conrad Veidt (1893–1943), German actor
 Karl Veidt (1879-1946), German Lutheran theologian
 Werner Veidt (1903-1992), German actor and author

Fictional characters
 Adrian Veidt or Ozymandias (Watchmen), in the comic book series Watchmen

See also
 Veit (disambiguation)

References

German-language surnames